Dick Vrij is a retired Dutch professional wrestler and mixed martial artist. A professional competitor from 1995 until 2003, he competed in the Heavyweight division for RINGS and It's Showtime.

Professional wrestling career
A former bodybuilder and club bouncer, Vrij started training martial arts at the Chris Dolman gym. He had his debut to a worldwide audience when he wrestled a special match in Japanese pro wrestling promotion UWF Newborn, facing Yoshiaki Fujiwara in a losing effort. He would return to defeat Yoji Anjo and lose again to Fujiwara. When the promotion closed, Dolman and Vrij followed UWF member Akira Maeda to his Fighting Network RINGS promotion in 1990, becoming full time wrestlers for it.

Mixed martial arts career

Fighting Network RINGS
Vrij took part in RINGS's first main event, wrestling Maeda himself. He later became famous for his kickboxing strikes and intimidating physique, being nicknamed "Cyborg".

Vrij competed both in pro wrestling and shoot matches, having the first of them at the event RINGS Mega Battle IV, where he knocked out Mitsuya Nagai with a palm strike. He would defeat him in a rematch in RINGS Holland, knocking Nagai several times before winning by knee strike. They faced again in a rubber match in RINGS Maelstrom 6, but an improved Nagai capitalized on Vrij's lack of grappling skill and submitted him with a heel hook. Vrij would have another fight in Holland in 1997 against Pedro Palm, but the bout went to no contest due to Vrij landing an illegal kick while Palm was downed.

In February 1998, Vrij took on Ultimate Fighting Championship fighter Paul Varelans in a vale tudo rules match for his return to RINGS Holland. Dick fought in bad health and under heavy ephedrine medication for a foot injury gained in a wrestling match with Valentijn Overeem, but he did not back down from the event. The subsequent match was controversial, as although Dick dominated the first round with multiple unanswered combos, drawing abundant blood from Varelans's face and hitting ground and pound from the mount, the referee repeatedly pushed Vrij aside and restarted the bout instead of stopping it. At the second round, Vrij felt the effects of his health, and Varelans capitalized to land a right punch and knock him out, winning the match.

Vrij bounced back from the loss at the next Holland event, defeating another UFC alumnus in the form of Zane Frazier.

Mixed martial arts record

|-
| Win
| align=center| 7-7 (1)
| Barrington Patterson
| KO (punch)
| It's Showtime: Amsterdam Arena
| 
| align=center| 2
| align=center| 1:47
| Amsterdam, Netherlands
| 
|-
| Loss
| align=center| 6-7 (1)
| Chris Haseman
| Submission (rear-naked choke)
| RINGS Australia: NR 3
| 
| align=center| 1
| align=center| 5:17
| Australia
| 
|-
| Win
| align=center| 6-6 (1)
| Zane Frazier
| KO (punch)
| RINGS Holland: Judgement Day
| 
| align=center| 1
| align=center| 2:34
| Amsterdam, Netherlands
| 
|-
| Loss
| align=center| 5-6 (1)
| Wataru Sakata
| TKO
| RINGS: World Mega Battle Tournament
| 
| align=center| 1
| align=center| 2:29
| Japan
| 
|-
| Loss
| align=center| 5-5 (1)
| Paul Varelans
| KO (punch)
| RINGS Holland: The King of Rings
| 
| align=center| 2
| align=center| 0:30
| Amsterdam, Netherlands
| 
|-
| Loss
| align=center| 5-4 (1)
| Magomedkhan Gamzatkhanov
| N/A
| RINGS: Battle Dimensions Tournament 1997 Final
| 
| align=center| 0
| align=center| 0:00
| Japan
| 
|-
| Win
| align=center| 5-3 (1)
| Tariel Bitsadze
| Submission (rear-naked choke)
| RINGS: Mega Battle Tournament 1997 Semifinal 1
| 
| align=center| 1
| align=center| 6:07
| Japan
| 
|-
| Win
| align=center| 4-3 (1)
| Tony Halme
| TKO (doctor stoppage)
| RINGS: Extension Fighting 2
| 
| align=center| 1
| align=center| 2:42
| Japan
| 
|-
| NC
| align=center| 3-3 (1)
| Pedro Palm
| No Contest
| RINGS Holland: The Final Challenge
| 
| align=center| 1
| align=center| 1:00
| Amsterdam, Netherlands
| 
|-
| Loss
| align=center| 3-3
| Tsuyoshi Kosaka
| N/A
| RINGS: Battle Dimensions Tournament 1996 Opening Round
| 
| align=center| 0
| align=center| 0:00
| Japan
| 
|-
| Loss
| align=center| 3-2
| Mitsuya Nagai
| Submission (heel hook)
| RINGS: Maelstrom 6
| 
| align=center| 1
| align=center| 6:16
| Japan
| 
|-
| Win
| align=center| 3-1
| Hubert Numrich
| Submission (forearm choke)
| RINGS Holland: Kings of Martial Arts
| 
| align=center| 1
| align=center| 1:48
| Amsterdam, Netherlands
| 
|-
| Loss
| align=center| 2-1
| Akira Maeda
| N/A
| RINGS: Battle Dimensions Tournament 1995 Opening Round
| 
| align=center| 0
| align=center| 0:00
| Japan
| 
|-
| Win
| align=center| 2-0
| Mitsuya Nagai
| KO (knee)
| RINGS Holland: Free Fight
| 
| align=center| 1
| align=center| 3:07
| Amsterdam, Netherlands
| 
|-
| Win
| align=center| 1-0
| Tony Halme
| KO
| RINGS: Budokan Hall 1995
| 
| align=center| 1
| align=center| 2:55
| Tokyo, Japan
|

See also
List of male mixed martial artists

References

External links
 
 Dick Vrij  at mixedmartialarts.com
 Dick Vrij at fightmatrix.com

Dutch male mixed martial artists
Heavyweight mixed martial artists
Mixed martial artists utilizing kickboxing
Mixed martial artists utilizing wrestling
Dutch male professional wrestlers
Living people
Sportspeople from Amsterdam
1959 births